The West Fourth Street–Washington Square station is an express station and transfer stop on the IND Sixth Avenue and IND Eighth Avenue Lines of the New York City Subway, located at the intersection of West Fourth Street and Sixth Avenue (Avenue of the Americas) in Greenwich Village, Manhattan. It is served by the A, D, E, and F trains at all times; the B and M trains on weekdays; the C train at all times except late nights; and the <F> train during rush hours in the peak direction.

The West Fourth Street station was built as an express station for the Independent Subway System (IND)'s Sixth Avenue and Eighth Avenue Lines. It has four island platforms and eight tracks, split evenly across two levels, which are connected by a mezzanine. The Eighth Avenue Line platforms on the upper level opened on September 10, 1932, as part of the IND's first segment, while the Sixth Avenue Line platforms on the lower level opened on December 15, 1940. The West Fourth Street station contains elevators, which make it compliant with the Americans with Disabilities Act of 1990. The station is listed on the National Register of Historic Places.

History

Construction and opening
On December 9, 1924, the New York City Board of Transportation (BOT) gave preliminary approval for the construction of the IND Eighth Avenue Line. This line consisted of a corridor connecting Inwood, Manhattan, to Downtown Brooklyn, running largely under Eighth Avenue but also paralleling Greenwich Avenue and Sixth Avenue in Lower Manhattan.

An additional line, the IND Sixth Avenue Line, was approved in 1925, running from Midtown Manhattan underneath Sixth Avenue, Houston Street, Essex Street, and the Rutgers Street Tunnel to Downtown Brooklyn. The IND Sixth Avenue Line was designed to replace the elevated IRT Sixth Avenue Line. The transfer hub between the Eighth Avenue and Sixth Avenue lines, at Sixth Avenue and West 4th Street in Greenwich Village, was named "West Fourth Street" as opposed to merely "Fourth Street" because the planners of the Independent Subway System believed there would be confusion between this station and "South Fourth Street", a proposed transfer station on the never-built IND Second System in Williamsburg, Brooklyn. Real estate developers expected that the construction of the West Fourth Street station would spur development around Sixth Avenue in Lower Manhattan.

Eighth Avenue Line 
Work on the IND Eighth Avenue Line began in 1925. Most of the Eighth Avenue Line was dug using a cheap cut-and-cover method. The West 4th Street station was to be one of three Eighth Avenue Line stations underneath Sixth Avenue in Lower Manhattan; the other two stations were to be at Spring Street and Walker Street. As part of the construction of the Eighth Avenue Line in Lower Manhattan, Sixth Avenue was extended south to Church Street starting in 1926. This required the demolition of dozens of buildings along the route, including a hotel and several houses within the vicinity of the West Fourth Street station. By August 1930, the BOT reported that the Eighth Avenue Line was nearly completed, except for the stations between Chambers Street–Hudson Terminal and West Fourth Street, which were only 21 percent completed.

A preview event for the new subway was hosted on September 8, 1932, two days before the official opening. The upper level of the West Fourth Street station opened on September 10, 1932, as part of the city-operated IND's initial segment, the Eighth Avenue Line between Chambers Street and 207th Street. When the station opened in 1932, express (A) and local (AA) trains served the line; expresses did not run during late nights or Sundays. When the IND Concourse Line opened on July 1, 1933, the C express train started operating, while all locals became CC trains to the Concourse Line. The E began using the local tracks on August 19, 1933, when the IND Queens Boulevard Line opened.

Sixth Avenue Line 
The first portion of the Sixth Avenue Line to be constructed was the Houston–Essex Street Line south of the West Fourth Street station. The contract for the line was awarded to Corson Construction in January 1929, and work officially started in May 1929. The Houston–Essex Street Line opened on January 1, 1936.  Two local tracks split from a junction with the Eighth Avenue Line south of West Fourth Street–Washington Square, running east under Houston Street and south under Essex Street to a temporary terminal at East Broadway. The E train, which had traveled to Chambers Street, was diverted along the new line south of West Fourth Street. When the Houston–Essex Street Line was completed in April 1936, E trains and ran to Church Avenue. 

The Midtown section of the Sixth Avenue Line was much more difficult to construct because part of this stretch of Sixth Avenue was already occupied by the Hudson & Manhattan Railroad (H&M)'s Uptown Hudson Tubes, which ran between Eighth and 33rd Streets. As a result, negotiations between the city and the H&M continued for several years. The IND and H&M finally came to an agreement in 1930. The city had decided to build the IND Sixth Avenue Line's local tracks around the pre-existing H&M tubes, and add express tracks for the IND underneath the H&M tubes at a later date.

The Midtown section of the Sixth Avenue Line did not begin construction until March 1936. The line was to connect with the lower level of the West Fourth Street station, which had already been constructed. The line's Midtown section opened on December 15, 1940. The F train, which made local stops along the Sixth Avenue Line, replaced the E train along the Houston–Essex Street Line and started serving the lower level of the West Fourth Street station.

Modifications 
The Sixth Avenue Line's Midtown section, comprising the section between the West Fourth Street and 34th Street–Herald Square stations, originally did not have express tracks. On April 19, 1961, ground was broken for a $22 million project to build two express tracks between these two stations. On November 26, 1967, the express tracks started to be used by the B and D trains. At that time, the first part of the Chrystie Street Connection opened, connecting the express tracks at the Broadway–Lafayette Street station one stop south to the Manhattan Bridge. On July 1, 1968, another section of the Chrystie Street Connection opened, allowing Sixth and Eighth Avenue local trains to use the Williamsburg Bridge. The Williamsburg Bridge connection has been used by the M train since 2010.

As early as 1965, Manhattan borough president Earl Brown requested that mayor Robert F. Wagner Jr. add funding for an escalator at the West Fourth Street station to the city's capital budget. Two up-only escalators were installed in the station in 1970, connecting the Sixth Avenue Line platforms to the Eighth Avenue Line platforms; one escalator was installed on the northbound side, while the other was installed on the southbound side. As part of a $4.3 million project, the Metropolitan Transportation Authority (MTA) closed the escalators for renovations in 1998.

In 2002, the MTA announced that elevators would be installed at the West Fourth Street station. The elevator installation was delayed by over a year and was finally completed in April 2005, but the elevators then suffered from frequent breakdowns. In 2005 alone, the three elevators were out of service for a cumulative nine months, and one elevator was closed off for 134 days. That year, passengers made 57 complaints about the elevators, including seven instances in which riders were trapped in the elevators. Consequently, disability-rights groups sued the MTA over the elevators.

Station layout

The West Fourth Street station was built by the IND as the major transfer point between its two Manhattan trunk lines. It can be considered the "heart" of the IND system as it is the location of the zero point on the IND chaining. It is a bi-level station with a connecting concourse between the two platform levels. The Eighth Avenue Line occupies the upper level, while the Sixth Avenue Line uses the lower level. Both levels use identical platform arrangements–two island platforms between four tracks, allowing for cross-platform interchanges between local and express trains in each direction.

There are three fare control areas – two at the northern end of the station, and one at the southern end. All lead directly to the Eighth Avenue Line on the upper level platforms; access to the Sixth Avenue Line on the lower level is via stairs and elevators from the upper level and/or the full-length mezzanine between the two levels. Several escalators are present, which go directly between one of the lower level platforms to its corresponding upper level platform. The elevators, added in April 2005 to make the station ADA-accessible, provide access to both levels and to the mezzanine.

The walls of the station contain green-tile bands with green borders; since West 4th Street is an express station, it has a wider tile band than local stations. When the station was being built, New York University (NYU) officials had requested that the station contain purple tile bands because that was NYU's official color. However, this was not done because  Small tile captions reading "WEST 4" run below the trim lines at regular intervals. Hunter green I-beam columns run along all the platforms, alternating ones having the standard black station name plate; The signs read "West 4 Street", replacing the older signs which simply read "W4".

Exits

The station does not have an exit to Fourth Street itself anymore, though an exit formerly existed there. The northern exits are on the northern side of 6th Avenue and Waverly Place. Two staircases go up to the northeast corner, both built into alcoves of stores, and one to the northwest corner. The southern exits are at West Third Street, on the east and west sides of 6th Avenue.

Two to the northwest corner (within building), one to the northeast corner (within building) of Sixth Avenue and Waverly Place
One to the east side of Sixth Avenue north of Waverly Place
 One elevator and staircase on the northeast corner of Sixth Avenue and West Third Street
One on the west side of Sixth Avenue at West Third Street

There are also four additional closed exits that directly led to the mezzanine. Two went to Washington Place, and the other two went to West 4th Street itself. There is a fifth closed exit at one northern fare control area; it led to the southwestern corner of Greenwich Avenue and Sixth Avenue.

Nearby points of interest 
 New York University
 Washington Square Park
 West Fourth Street Courts

References

External links 

nycsubway.org

 
 

Google Maps Street View

 Waverly Place entrance from Google Maps Street View
 Entrance north of Waverly Place from Google Maps Street View
 West Third Street entrance from Google Maps Street View
 Mezzanine from Google Maps Street View
 Upper level from Google Maps Street View
 Lower level from Google Maps Street View

IND Eighth Avenue Line stations
IND Sixth Avenue Line stations
Sixth Avenue
Greenwich Village
Railway and subway stations on the National Register of Historic Places in Manhattan
New York City Subway stations in Manhattan
Railway stations in the United States opened in 1932
1932 establishments in New York City
New York City Subway transfer stations
West Village
New York City Subway stations at university and college campuses